Arthur William John Becker III (May 23, 1927 – September 12, 2015) was an American theatre critic and film distributor.

Education
He was born in St. Louis, Missouri to Margaret Heath and Arthur Becker Jr. Becker first attended Washington University in St. Louis, where he began writing to Henry Miller. Becker transferred to Duke University, then Harvard, where he met George Plimpton. He next studied abroad as a Rhodes Scholar at Wadham College, Oxford, earning a Ph.D.

Career
Becker's service with the United States Navy sent him to Guam. He spent the 1950s writing for The Hudson Review, where he met Roger L. Stevens, who later financed Becker's acquisition of Playbill. In 1965, Becker and Saul J. Turell partnered to buy Janus Films from founders Bryant Haliday and Cyrus Harvey, Jr.

Personal 
Becker was married to Patricia Birch, with whom he had three children, including the photographer Jonathan Becker.

Becker died of kidney failure on September 12, 2015, in Southampton, New York at the age of 88.

References

External links

1927 births
2015 deaths
Deaths from kidney failure
American film studio executives
Writers from St. Louis
Washington University in St. Louis alumni
Duke University alumni
Harvard University alumni
Alumni of Wadham College, Oxford
American Rhodes Scholars
American theater critics